Enrico Zampa (born 18 March 1992) is an Italian footballer who plays as a defensive midfielder for  club Turris.

Club career
On 2 September 2019, he joined Rieti on loan.

On 3 January 2022, he signed with Turris until the end of the 2021–22 season, with an option to extend.

On 5 August 2022, Zampa moved to Brindisi in Serie D.

References

External links

1992 births
Living people
People from Frascati
Footballers from Lazio
Sportspeople from the Metropolitan City of Rome Capital
Italian footballers
Association football midfielders
S.S. Lazio players
U.S. Salernitana 1919 players
FeralpiSalò players
Trapani Calcio players
Ternana Calcio players
U.S. Ancona 1905 players
S.S. Monopoli 1966 players
F.C. Rieti players
Potenza Calcio players
S.S. Turris Calcio players
S.S.D. Città di Brindisi players
Serie A players
Serie B players
Serie C players
Serie D players